Codseeker was a fishing schooner launched in April, 1877 that capsized east of Cape Sable Island, at the southwestern tip of Nova Scotia.

Description

The schooner Codseeker was constructed at Port Clyde, Nova Scotia in 1877 by Thomas Coffin & Company. At the time, the Coffin's were known for their beautifully crafted ships, mostly schooners and square-rigged ships which sailed all over the world. She was a wooden vessel, constructed for the profitable, yet dangerous fishing along the coasts of Nova Scotia and Newfoundland. 
Codseeker had a net gross ton of 42 and registered ton of 29.5. The vessel sailed with the standard rigging and gaf topsail. A schooner with her dimensions would have required a certain amount of ballast to combat lateral forces against the sail. However, Codseeker was not built with the customary amount of counterbalance, most likely due to the schooner's depth.

The Wreck 

On 9 May 1877, while on her very first fishing outing, the brand new schooner capsized just east of Cape Sable Island. Eastern wind had been increasing the entire day and had turned into a storm, which caused strain on the slender vessel. Once the wind increased, the schooner started rolling heavily to its leeward side, often taking its time to recover. At this time, Captain Phillip Brown ordered the mainsail down, and headed for land. According to Brown, sailing towards the Shoal of the Rock would mean a shorter and steeper run of sea, and therefore no need to reef the foresail. However, the lightness of the vessel, being empty in the hold, caused severe and unnatural rocking and she gradually careened over until Codseeker was flat on the beam-ends. Half of the schooners deck became submerged in frigid Atlantic water.

Quickly after Codseeker keeled over, Brown, as well as a cook and another young fisherman, were able to locate a fishing dory, which sat between the foremast and the mainmast of Codseeker. Once the three men dislodged the small dory, they attempted to rescue the remaining men, but had drifted out too far while bailing the excess water out of the dory.

There were a total of thirteen crewmen on Codseeker. Nine of the men were on deck when the vessel capsized and four were below. Of the thirteen men, nine survived the wreck of Codseeker, two of which spent three days trapped in the hulk of the overturned ship.

On May 10, the two-masted schooner Matchless set to rescue any living men left behind in the wreckage, unfortunately leaving two men, who, unknown to Brown and the rest of Matchless crew, were trapped alive under Codseeker. On May 12, the schooner Ohio was passing by the wreckage, when the crew realized that two members of Codseeker were still on the ship.

After the rescue, Codseeker was towed into Green Cove, Yarmouth County by the two schooners Condor and Dove.

The Aftermath 

Only two months after the disaster of Codseeker, she was back in the water, fully repaired. She continued on the registry books until 1953, when her registration showed a closure reason of "no longer exists".

References

Easton, Alan (1992). Terror On The Coast: The Wreck of the Codseeker. Nimbus Publishing Limited
Murphy, William M. (1976). Great Canadian Adventures: The Wreck of the Codseeker
Vessel Registry, Maritime Museum of the Atlantic, Halifax, Nova Scotia

Schooners
Sailing ships of Canada
Transport in Shelburne County, Nova Scotia
Maritime history of Canada
Individual sailing vessels
Ships built in Nova Scotia
1877 ships